Pat Spencer may refer to: 

 Pat Spencer (basketball), American basketball player and collegiate lacrosse player
 Patricia Spencer, one of the two American teenagers who disappeared in 1969
 Pat Spencer (General Hospital), a character of the General Hospital television series

See also
Patrick Spencer, Antiguan former cyclist